Ss Leonard & Mary Roman Catholic Church is a medieval church situated in Malton, North Yorkshire, England, now serving a parish in the Roman Catholic Diocese of Middlesbrough. It is a Grade II* listed building in the National Heritage List for England, and retains at least 24 pieces of medieval figurative carving.

A notice outside of the church reads:
"St Leonard's with St Mary's. Founded in the 12th century as a Chapel of Ease to the Gilbertine Priory at Old Malton. 
This Church was transferred by way of gift as an ecumenical gesture of goodwill from the Church of England to the Roman Catholic Church in 1971."

Dating as it does from the mid- to late-1100s, this church is the oldest currently held by Catholics in England, a distinction formerly belonging to St Etheldreda's, London, which was built some time between 1250 and 1290. St Leonard's is the first English parish church to be returned to Roman Catholic use following the Reformation.

History
The first known mention of St. Leonard's is around 1150, when it was given, together with St Michael's, to the Gilbertine order as a chapel of ease for the Malton Priory, about a mile distant in "old" Malton. The church's tower was built in the 15th century. It originally had a stone spire, which was later replaced by one of timber and slate.

The church passed into the hands of the new Church of England around December 1539, when the dissolution of the monasteries by Henry VIII closed the Malton Priory.

In 1768 a peal of 8 bells was added to the tower, cast by Lester and Pack (later the Whitechapel Bell Foundry). A tower clock was installed in 1897, to celebrate the Diamond Jubilee of Queen Victoria.

Over the centuries there were considerable changes to the building. In 1907 a restoration attempt was undertaken by the architect Charles Hodgson Fowler. This included a refenestration of the north elevation and a rebuilding of the south walls of the nave and chancel.

In 1969, the Church of England closed St Leonard's and, in 1971, presented it to the Roman Catholic Church in a gesture of goodwill.  At that time, the dedication of the church to St Leonard was extended to include St Mary: it was from the Catholic chapel to St Mary in Wells Street, Malton, that the congregation transferred. A stained glass window from that chapel was conveyed as a physical marker of this move.

In 1988-9 there was a major reordering of the floor plan: a dais with an altar was placed in the middle of the nave on the south side and the seating arranged around that. The old chancel was retained as the Blessed Sacrament chapel, separated from the nave by an open screen.

References

External links
External photograph of St Leonard's RC Church, Malton
Another external photograph of Saints Leonard & Mary church
A Grade II* Listed Building in Malton, North Yorkshire
About Malton
Parish's Facebook entry
Website for the Parish, with photographs of the church interior
Find A Grave: St. Leonard with St. Mary Churchyard Memorials

Roman Catholic churches in North Yorkshire
Church buildings converted to a different denomination
12th-century church buildings in England
Grade II* listed churches in North Yorkshire
Saints Leonard and Mary, Malton
12th-century Roman Catholic church buildings in the United Kingdom